This is a list of Sites of Community Importance designated by the Ministry of Agriculture, Food and Environment.

See also 
 List of Sites of Community Importance in Spain

References 
 Lisf of sites of community importance in MAGRAMA

Environment of Spain